Lynne Osterman (born December 12, 1962) is an American politician and project manager.

Born in Golden Valley, Minnesota, Osterman received her bachelor's degree in communications from St. Cloud State University. Osterman is a consultant, serving primarily nonprofit organizations. She lives in New Hope, Minnesota. Osterman has remained somewhat involved in politics throughout her adult life, weighing in on issues as a registered lobbyist on behalf of her clients, having served in the Minnesota House of Representatives in 2003 and 2004 as a Republican.

Notes

1962 births
Living people
People from Golden Valley, Minnesota
St. Cloud State University alumni
Women state legislators in Minnesota
Republican Party members of the Minnesota House of Representatives
21st-century American politicians
21st-century American women politicians
People from New Hope, Minnesota